Scribbler is a British chain of greetings card retail shops. As of July 2016, they have 33 outlets throughout the UK.

Scribbler were founded in 1981, and as of 2012, are still run by the original management team. Scribbler state that they are "at the forefront of edgy humour and great design".

References

External links

Retail companies of the United Kingdom